Allen Scott Miller (born 1968) is an American Southern rock and alternative country singer, songwriter, and guitarist.

Biography
Miller grew up on a farm in Swoope, Virginia. After graduating from William & Mary, he moved to Knoxville, Tennessee in 1990.  In 1994, he helped form a band called the Viceroys, which was renamed The V-Roys to avoid confusion with an existing group. The V-Roys were the first act signed on Steve Earle's label, E-Squared Records.

After the V-Roys split up in 1999, Miller formed a new band, Scott Miller and the Commonwealth, who were briefly the house band on Blue Collar TV. The Lexington Herald-Leader wrote of Miller's first albums after the V-Roys as "strong, folk-infused songs" in which "the boozy charm of his music was innocuous."

Miller's songs reflect his degrees in American history and Russian studies, with references to his home, family, history, geography, writers and Appalachia. As of 2011, Miller was based in Staunton, Virginia, having moved back home to help manage the family cattle farm.  Miller collaborated with filmmaker James Weems and photographer Glen Rose on mini-documentary Going Home which explores Miller's personal and musical journey in returning to the family farm.

As of 2015, in addition to solo shows, Miller played some shows with a full Commonwealth band lineup, but more often played trio shows with what he has come to call the Commonwealth Ladies Auxiliary (bass player Bryn Davies and fiddler Rayna Gellert).

Discography
Solo:
Are You With Me? (2000) – live, independent self-release
For Crying Out Loud (2008) – self-released on F.A.Y. Recordings
Christmas Gift EP (2010) – self-released on F.A.Y. Recordings
Big Big World (2013) – self-released on F.A.Y. Recordings
Ladies Auxiliary (11/2017) – self-released on F.A.Y. Recordings

As Scott Miller & the Commonwealth:
Thus Always to Tyrants (2001) – Sugar Hill
Upside Downside (2003) – Sugar Hill
Citation (2006) – Sugar Hill
Reconstruction (2007) – live, independent self-release

With Rayna Gellert:
CoDependents EP (2012) – self-released on F.A.Y. Recordings

References

External links
Official website
Allen Scott Miller repertoire at BMI

Live Music Archive Collection of Live Scott Miller Shows for Streaming Online or Download
2003 story in Metro Pulse
Scott Miller at The Music Box: A collection of concert and album reviews of Scott Miller & The V-Roys.
The V-Roys - Home page of Miller's old band, the V-Roys.

American alternative country singers
American country singer-songwriters
Musicians from Knoxville, Tennessee
People from Augusta County, Virginia
Singer-songwriters from Virginia
Living people
College of William & Mary alumni
1968 births
Singer-songwriters from Tennessee